Rachel Renee Jones (born December 18, 1984) is an American politician who served in the Maryland House of Delegates from District 27B from February 18, 2021, to January 11, 2023. She is a member of the Democratic Party.

Biography
Rachel Jones is an American politician who represented District 27B in the Maryland House of Delegates. She was appointed by Maryland Governor Larry Hogan to finish the term of Michael Jackson who had been appointed to the Maryland State Senate to fill the vacancy created when Senate President Thomas V. Miller Jr. resigned.

Jones was born in Prince Frederick, Maryland, December 18, 1984. She graduated from Calvert High School in 2002 and matriculated to Morgan State University. By 2007 she had completed her studies and was awarded a Bachelor of Sciences degree in Political Science.

Jones ran for her seat in the 2022 subernatorial elections, losing in the Democratic primary to her eventual successor, Jeffrie Long Jr..

References

21st-century American politicians
Living people
Democratic Party members of the Maryland House of Delegates
Women state legislators in Maryland
21st-century American women politicians
21st-century African-American women
21st-century African-American politicians
African-American state legislators in Maryland
1984 births